This is a list of universities, university colleges and colleges in Northern Ireland.

Universities 
Queen's University Belfast
St Mary's University College
Stranmillis University College
Ulster University
Belfast Campus
Coleraine Campus
Jordanstown Campus
Magee Campus (Magee College)

Further and higher education colleges 
 Belfast Metropolitan College (53,000 students at 3 campuses within Belfast - Titanic Quarter, Castlereagh and Millfield)
 North West Regional College (24,000 students at 3 campuses - Derry, Limavady, Strabane)
 Northern Regional College (35,000 students at 7 campuses - Antrim, Ballymena, Ballymoney, Coleraine, Larne, Magherafelt, Newtownabbey)
 South Eastern Regional College (30,000 students at 6 campuses - Ballynahinch, Bangor, Downpatrick, Lisburn, Newcastle, Newtownards)
 South West College (18,500 students at 4 campuses)
 Southern Regional College (50,000 students at 6 campuses - Armagh, Banbridge, Kilkeel, Lurgan, Newry, Portadown)

Other colleges 
 College of Agriculture, Food and Rural Enterprise has three campuses at Greenmount, Enniskillen and Loughry
 Constituent theological colleges of Queen's University Belfast Institute of Theology
 Belfast Bible College
 Edgehill Theological College
 Irish Baptist College
 Union Theological College
Whitefield College of the Bible, Banbridge is an independent theological college operated by the Free Presbyterian Church of Ulster

Defunct institutions 
This is a list of defunct institutions due to closure or merger and not because they have been renamed.

New University of Ulster (1968–1984)
Ulster Polytechnic (1971–1984)
 St. Joseph's Training College (1961 - 1985)
Magee University College (1865–1968)

See also 
 Armorial of UK universities
 Education in Northern Ireland
 List of universities in the United Kingdom
 List of colleges in the United Kingdom offering higher education courses

References

External links 
 NUS-USI Student Movement

 
Northern Ireland
Universities
Universities